The 2013–14 PFC CSKA Moscow season was the 22nd successive season the club will play in the Russian Premier League, the highest tier of football in Russia. CSKA successfully defended their Russian Premier League while also winning the Russian Super Cup. They reached the semi-finals of the Russian Cup, where they were defeated by Krasnodar, and they were eliminated from the UEFA Champions League at the group stage.

Season events
On 1 February 2014, CSKA announced goalkeeper Igor Akinfeev had signed a new contract lasting until the summer of 2019.

Squad

Transfers

In

Out

Loans out

Released

Trial

Friendlies

Competitions

Russian Super Cup

Russian Premier League

Results by round

Results

League table

Russian Cup

UEFA Champions League

Group stage

Squad statistics

Appearances and goals

|-
|colspan="14"|Players away from the club on loan:

|-
|colspan="14"|Players who appeared for CSKA Moscow no longer at the club:

|}

Goal scorers

Disciplinary record

References

PFC CSKA Moscow seasons
CSKA Moscow
CSKA Moscow
Russian football championship-winning seasons